Jacques Chagnon (born August 28, 1952) is a retired Canadian politician who served in the National Assembly of Quebec from 1985 to 2018. He holds a bachelor's degree in political science from Concordia University and graduate degrees in political science and in Law from the Université de Montréal. He is a former school board commissioner, former president of the Chambly regional school board and the former president of the Fédération des commission scolaires catholiques du Québec. He represented the electoral districts of Saint-Louis from 1985 to 1994 and Westmount–Saint-Louis from 1994 to 2018 as a member of the Quebec Liberal Party (QLP).

He was the Minister of Education in the government of Daniel Johnson from January 11, 1994 to September 26, 1994 when the QLP was defeated in the 1994 election. When the QLP retook power in 2003, he was appointed to cabinet by Premier Jean Charest as Minister of Public Security from April 29, 2003 to February  18, 2005. During his time as Minister of Public Security, he had to deal with the Kanesatake crisis. His performance during this time as well as certain remarks that were perceived as offensive towards aboriginals may explain Charest's decision to drop him from cabinet in 2005. Chagnon was the chair the committee on education in the National Assembly until 2007 and was named the Second Vice-President of the National Assembly after the elections.

Chagnon was first elected in the riding of Saint-Louis in the 1985 election and was re-elected again in 1989. He was then elected in the new riding of Westmount–Saint-Louis during the 1994 election. He was subsequently re-elected in this riding in the 1998, 2003, 2007, 2008 and 2012 elections. On April 5, 2011 Chagnon was appointed Speaker of the National Assembly, serving until his retirement in 2018.

In May 2020 he was accused of unwanted sexual contact by then visiting president of the Wallonian parliament, Emily Hoyos, dating back to 2011. However, charges were never filled.

See also 
Politics of Quebec
Quebec general elections
Quebec Liberal Party

Electoral record (partial)

References

External links 

 

1952 births
Concordia University alumni
Living people
Members of the Executive Council of Quebec
Politicians from Montreal
Quebec Liberal Party MNAs
Presidents of the National Assembly of Quebec
Vice Presidents of the National Assembly of Quebec
21st-century Canadian politicians